Jaimes is the name of:

Surname 
Bartolomé Jaimes (1522–1603), Spanish nobleman and conquistador
Brenden Jaimes (born 1999), American football player
Sam Jaimes, American animator
Ulises Jaimes (born 1996), Mexican footballer

Given name 
 Jaimes McKee (born 1987), English-born Hong Kong footballer

See also 
 Jaime
 James (disambiguation)

Surnames from given names